Founded in 2000, the HomeForm Group was one of the largest retailers of fitted home improvement products in the United Kingdom. The head office was in Cornbrook, Manchester. HomeForm operated several brands, namely Möben Kitchens, Sharps Bedrooms, Dolphin Bathrooms and Kitchens Direct. 

The HomeForm Group was affiliated with private equity firm Sun Capital Partners but in 2007 was sold to an undisclosed buyer in the United States.

HomeForm went into administration in 2011. The Möben, Dolphin and Kitchens Direct businesses were subsequently closed down, and Sharps Bedrooms was sold.

Prior to entering administration, the company had 160 showrooms across the UK and employed more than 1,300 showroom staff. Additionally, it employed more than 1,500 fitters and designers.

References

External links

Defunct retail companies of the United Kingdom
Defunct companies based in Manchester
Kitchen manufacturers
Furniture retailers of the United Kingdom
Companies that have entered administration in the United Kingdom
2000 establishments in the United Kingdom
2011 disestablishments in the United Kingdom
Retail companies established in 2000
Retail companies disestablished in 2011